Gorilla is the sixth studio album by American singer-songwriter James Taylor. Released in May 1975, it was more successful than Walking Man, his previous release. Two album tracks released as singles, "Mexico" and "How Sweet It Is (To Be Loved By You)", rose to the top five on the Billboard charts. This would be Taylor's second-to-last album of new material for Warner Bros. Records, his last being In the Pocket. In many ways, Gorilla showcased Taylor's electric, lighter side that became evident on Walking Man. The song "Sarah Maria" is about his daughter Sally (born Sarah Maria Taylor on January 7, 1974). His then-wife Carly Simon was featured on "How Sweet It Is (To Be Loved By You)", originally recorded by Marvin Gaye. Jimmy Buffett recorded "Mexico" on his 1995 album Barometer Soup and performed "Lighthouse" during his Salty Piece of Land tour of 2005.

Track listing
All songs by James Taylor unless otherwise noted.

Side one
"Mexico" – 2:57
"Music" – 3:46
"How Sweet It Is (To Be Loved by You)" (Holland-Dozier-Holland) – 3:33
"Wandering" (Traditional; arrangement and additional lyrics: James Taylor) – 2:40
"Gorilla" – 3:10
"You Make It Easy" – 4:10

Side two
”I Was a Fool to Care" – 3:19
"Lighthouse" – 3:15
"Angry Blues" – 3:25
"Love Songs" – 5:45
"Sarah Maria" – 2:46

Personnel 
 James Taylor – lead vocals, acoustic guitar (1, 2, 4, 5, 7-11), electric guitar (1), harmony vocals (2, 4, 5, 10, 11), arrangements (4), ukulele (5), high-string acoustic guitar (10)
 Clarence McDonald – Fender Rhodes (2, 3, 6, 7), acoustic piano (3, 6)
 Nick DeCaro – accordion (4, 7, 11), string arrangements 
 Randy Newman – hornorgan (8)
 Danny Kortchmar – electric guitar (1, 3, 6)
 Al Perkins – pedal steel guitar (2, 10)
 David Grisman – mandolin (5, 11)
 Arthur Adams – electric guitar (7)
 Lowell George – electric guitar (9), harmony vocals (9)
 Leland Sklar – bass (1, 3, 7, 8, 11)
 Willie Weeks – bass (2, 5, 6, 9)
 Russ Kunkel – drums (1, 3, 7, 8, 10), shaker (1), tambourine (3), percussion (7), congas (10)
 Andy Newmark – drums (2, 5, 6, 9)
 Jim Keltner – drums (3)
 Milt Holland – percussion (1, 2, 9), wind chimes (10)
 Victor Feldman – percussion (9, 10), marimba (11)
 Gayle Levant – harp (1, 2, 10)
 David Sanborn – saxophone (3, 6)
 Jules Jacob – clarinet (5, 10), oboe (10)
 George Bohanon – trombone (7)
 Chuck Findley – trumpet (7)
 David Crosby – harmony vocals (1, 8)
 Graham Nash – harmony vocals (1, 8)
 Carly Simon – harmony vocals (3)
 Valerie Carter – harmony vocals (9)

Production 
 Producers – Russ Titelman and Lenny Waronker
 Engineered, Mixed and Mastered by Lee Herschberg
 Additional Engineer – Donn Landee
 Assistant Engineer – Loyd Clifft
 Recorded at The Burbank Studios (Burbank, CA).
 Mixed and Mastered at Warner Bros. Recording Studios (Hollywood, CA).
 Cover and Design – Mike Salisbury 
 Photography – Norman Seeff

Charts

References

1975 albums
James Taylor albums
Albums produced by Lenny Waronker
Albums produced by Russ Titelman
Warner Records albums